Westlake is the first album by English singer and songwriter David Westlake. The record was released in 1987 on Creation Records. Luke Haines describes it as "a minor classic".

Context
Westlake is a mini-album recorded 18–19 April 1987 at Greenhouse Studios in Islington, London by Paul Gadd (son of Gary Glitter) and Steve Nunn. The record was Luke Haines's first release. The Triffids' rhythm section plays on the record.
 
Alternative versions of three of the songs on Westlake ("The Word Around Town", "Dream Come True" and "Everlasting") feature in a BBC Radio One session recorded in January 1987 for Janice Long by David Westlake with Robert Forster, John Wills, Robert Vickers and Amanda Brown of The Go-Betweens.

Between 1985 and 1991 David Westlake was in British indie band The Servants.

Alternative versions of "The Word Around Town" and "She Grew and She Grew" appear on Hey Hey We're The Manqués, a collection of demos issued by Cherry Red Records in 2012 with the Servants' second album Small Time.

Release history
Creation Records issued the original vinyl album in November 1987.

The album was reissued on CD in 1993 after Sony Music Entertainment bought Creation Records.

The record is now unavailable. Its opening track, "The Word Around Town", is available on Doing God's Work - A Creation Compilation.

Track listing
All tracks written by David Westlake.
"The Word Around Town" – 3:35
"Dream Come True" – 3:22
"Rings On Her Fingers" – 4:39
"Everlasting" – 4:18
"She Grew And She Grew" – 3:33
"Talk Like That" – 3:19

Personnel
David Westlake – vocals and guitar
Luke Haines – guitar and piano
Martyn P. Casey – bass
Alsy MacDonald – drums

References

1987 debut albums
David Westlake albums